The current Constitution of the Republic of Serbia, also known as Mitrovdan Constitution was adopted in 2006, replacing the previous constitution dating from 1990. The adoption of new constitution became necessary in 2006 when Serbia became independent after Montenegro's secession and the dissolution of Serbia and Montenegro.

The proposed text of the constitution was adopted by the National Assembly on 30 September 2006 and put on referendum which was held on 28–29 October 2006. After 53.04% of the electorate supported the proposed constitution, it was officially adopted on 8 November 2006.

The Constitution contains a preamble, 206 articles, 11 parts, and twenty-four amendments.

Main provisions
Among the constitution's two hundred other articles are guarantees of human and minority rights, abolishment of capital punishment, and banning of human cloning. It assigns the Serbian Cyrillic alphabet as the official script, while making provisions for the use of minority languages at local levels. Among the differences between the current and previous constitution are:

Only private, corporate and public property is acknowledged; social assets shall cease to exist.
Foreign citizens are permitted to own property.
Full independence is granted to the National Bank of Serbia.
As part of a process of decentralization, the granting of municipal properties' ownership rights to local municipalities.
The province of Vojvodina is granted limited financial autonomy.
The constitution mentions "European values and standards" for the first time.
Large and small coats of arms were established.
 The constitution assigns the Serbian language and the Serbian Cyrillic alphabet as the official language and alphabet in use, respectively.
The adoption of the national anthem, Bože pravde (God of Justice).
Special protection for the rights of consumers, mothers, children and minorities.
Greater freedom of information.
Marriage is defined as the "union between a man and a woman"

Constitutional status of Kosovo
The current constitution defines the Autonomous Province of Kosovo and Metohija as an integral part of Serbia, but with "substantial autonomy". Under the opinion of the Venice Commission in respect to substantial autonomy of Kosovo, an examination of The Constitution makes it clear that this fundamental autonomy is not at all guaranteed at the constitutional level, as the constitution delegates almost every important aspect of this autonomy to the legislature.

Structure

Preamble
The Constitution of Serbia contains a preamble:

"Considering the state tradition of the Serbian people and equality of all citizens and ethnic communities in Serbia,

Considering also that the Province of Kosovo and Metohija is an integral part of the territory of Serbia, that it has the status of a substantial autonomy within the sovereign state of Serbia and that from such status of the Province of Kosovo and Metohija follow constitutional obligations of all state bodies to uphold and protect the state interests of Serbia in Kosovo and Metohija in all internal and foreign political relations,

the citizens of Serbia adopt"

Chapters
The Constitution of Serbia is divided into 10 chapters:

 Constitution Principles
 Human and Minority Rights and Freedoms
 Economic System and Public Finances
 Competencies of the Republic of Serbia
 Organisation of Government
 The Constitutional Court
 Territorial Organization
 Constitutionality and Legality
 Amending the Constitution
 Final Provision

Constitutional history
Serbia has adopted 14 constitutions throughout its history. Listed below in order of year adopted:

 Constitution of 1219, Kingdom of Serbia, “Zakonopravilo” (St. Sava's Nomocanon), the first Serbian constitution
 Constitution of 1349, Serbian Empire, “Dušanov Zakonik” (Emperor Dušan's Code. or Dušan’s Constitution)
 Constitution of Serbian Despotate, Mining Code , enacted by Despot Stefan Lazarević in 1412, formulated earlier in 1390, additions to previous Emperor Dušan’s Constitution incorporating early 15th century Serbian Mining Laws
 Period between 16th – 18th century (void).
 Constitution of the Principality of Serbia, adopted in 1835, so-called "Candlemas constitution" (Sretenje constitution).
 Constitution of 1838, often called "Turkish constitution", issued in the form of Turkish firman.
 Constitution of 1869, often called "Regents' constitution"; in place until 1888, then reinstated from 1894 to 1901.
 Constitution of the Kingdom of Serbia, adopted in 1888.
 Constitution of 1901, called "April constitution" and "Octroic constitution", promulgated by Alexander I of Serbia.
 Constitution of 1903, modified version of the Constitution of 1888.
 Between 1918 and 1945 Serbia was part of the Kingdom of Yugoslavia and Democratic Federal Yugoslavia, and had no constitution of its own.
 Constitution of the People's Republic of Serbia, adopted in 1947  (Serbia as part of the FPR Yugoslavia)
 Constitution of the Socialist Republic of Serbia, adopted in 1963 (Serbia as part of the SFR Yugoslavia)
 Constitution of 1974 (Serbia as part of the SFR Yugoslavia)
 Constitution of the Republic of Serbia, adopted in 1990 (Serbia as part of the SFR Yugoslavia in 1990–1992, FR Yugoslavia in 1992–2003 and Serbia and Montenegro in 2003–2006)
 Constitution of 2006, called "Mitrovdan constitution", current constitution, first constitution of the independent Republic of Serbia

Gallery

See also
2006 Serbian constitutional referendum
Political status of Kosovo
Constitutional Charter of Serbia and Montenegro

References

External links

Constitution of the Republic of Serbia in HTML format
Constitution of the Republic of Serbia  in PDF format
Previous Constitution of Serbia (1990)

Law of Serbia
Legal history of Serbia
 
Politics of Serbia
2006 in Serbia
2006 in law
November 2006 events in Europe
2006 in politics